Agonopterix seraphimella is a moth of the family Depressariidae. It is found in France.

References

Moths described in 1929
Agonopterix
Moths of Europe